Trevor David Laws (born June 14, 1985) is a former American football defensive tackle. After playing college football for the Notre Dame Fighting Irish, he was drafted by the Philadelphia Eagles in the second round of the 2008 NFL Draft. He played for the Eagles for four seasons from 2008 to 2011 and spent the 2012 season with the Rams on their injured reserve list.

Early years
Laws was born in Dayton, Ohio, and played high school football and wrestled at Apple Valley High School in Apple Valley, Minnesota. In football, Laws played fullback, linebacker, and defensive lineman. Laws was named Minnesota's Gatorade Player of the Year and was a first-team ESPN.com All-American. In wrestling, he led his team to three consecutive state championships in his sophomore, junior, and senior years. During his junior year, he had a wrestling record of 49-0, and was considered the best heavyweight wrestler in the nation. He was a three-time All-American in wrestling.

College career
At Notre Dame, Laws was a roommate of future Eagles teammate Victor Abiamiri. In 2007, Laws led the Fighting Irish with 4.0 sacks and 112 tackles, both career highs. He had the most tackles by a defensive lineman in the major college ranks in 2007.

Professional career

Philadelphia Eagles
Laws was drafted by the Philadelphia Eagles in the second round of the 2008 NFL Draft. In his rookie year, he played in all 16 games, and made 12 tackles. He also made four tackles in the playoffs. In 2009, Laws played in 11 games and made 10 tackles.

St. Louis Rams
The St. Louis Rams signed Laws to a one-year contract on April 11, 2012. Laws spent the entire 2012 season on the Rams' injured reserve list, not appearing in a single game with the team.

Personal life
Laws has two brothers, both of whom attended the University of Minnesota. Laws majored in marketing at the University of Notre Dame.

References

External links
Official website

Philadelphia Eagles bio
Notre Dame Fighting Irish football bio

1985 births
Living people
American football defensive tackles
Notre Dame Fighting Irish football players
Philadelphia Eagles players
Players of American football from Minnesota
Players of American football from Dayton, Ohio
St. Louis Rams players
Apple Valley High School (Minnesota) alumni